HMS Haddock was a Royal Navy schooner of four 12-pounder carronades and a crew of 20. The prime contractor for the vessel was Goodrich & Co., in Bermuda, and she was launched in 1805.

Haddock only sailed for some three to four years before the French captured her in 1809 in the English Channel. This schooner was the only Royal Navy ship ever to use the name.

Service
She was commissioned in April 1805 under Lieutenant John Buddle. Between 9 October and 15 November she was in Portsmouth, refitting. At this time the Admiralty had her lines taken. She would then act as the model for the subsequent s.

By 4 August 1805, when she sailed from Jamaica, she was under Lieutenant Edward Foley. She brought with her the mails for Falmouth originally intended for the Lord Chesterfield Packet. She also brought with her the former master of Leicester Packet. Haddock reached Scilly on 30 September, and arrived at Falmouth on 1 October 1805.

Haddock sailed for Jamaica on 11 December. On 22 May 1806 she captured Arrogante, for which head money for 19 men was paid in March 1828. In 1808 Lieutenant Charles William Selwyn took command.

On 6 September, the American vessel Nancy, Ringhaven, master, arrived at Jamaica. She had been sailing from Havana to Jamaica when Haddock detained her and sent her in.

Fate
On 12 November 1809 the 18-gun  captured Haddock, which was under the command of Lieutenant Henry Edwards.

Haddock was on her way from Jamaica with dispatches, when at 1:30pm she sighted a brig that began to give chase. In her attempt to escape, Haddock threw her guns, shot and stores overboard. Still, the brig gained. Haddock surrendered at 8:30pm, having first thrown her signals and dispatches overboard.

The encounter occurred in the Atlantic, or the Channel. Génie was an  naval brig armed with eighteen 24-pounder carronades; she was under the command of lieutenant de vaisseau de Grave.

On 16 November Génie captured two more vessels. The second was Fortune, of Bristol, Hare, master, which had been sailing from St Croix to London. The Frenchmen plundered Lusitania and then put the captured crews on board her. Next the Frenchmen sank Fortune and Haddock and let Lusitania depart. Lusitania arrived at Portsmouth on 25 November.

Notes

Citations

References
 
 
 
  

 

1805 ships
Ballahoo-class schooners
Captured ships
Ships built in Bermuda
Maritime incidents in 1809